Dinko Jukić (born 9 January 1989 in Dubrovnik) is a retired medley and butterfly swimmer from Austria of Croatian origin.

Biography
He competed for Austria at the 2008 Summer Olympics in Beijing, China, finishing in tenth place in the men's 200 m butterfly event, 16th in the 200 m individual medley and 15th in the 400 m individual medley. 

At the 2012 Summer Olympics in London he managed a 4th-place finish in the men's 200 m butterfly event. Despite setting a new national record of 1:54.35 in the final, he missed the bronze medal by more than a second. 

He is the younger brother of swimmer Mirna Jukić. 

After suffering a serious back injury in 2012, Jukić came back after 2 years break, posting a new 100 m freestyle national record (January 2015).

References

1989 births
Living people
Austrian male freestyle swimmers
Austrian male medley swimmers
Austrian male butterfly swimmers
Swimmers at the 2008 Summer Olympics
Swimmers at the 2012 Summer Olympics
Olympic swimmers of Austria
People from Dubrovnik
Croatian emigrants to Austria
European Aquatics Championships medalists in swimming

Austrian people of Croatian descent
21st-century Austrian people